When the Wind Blows is a 1930 Our Gang short comedy film directed by James W. Horne. It was the 97th Our Gang short to be released.

Plot
It is a windy spring night. A man tells Kennedy the cop that it is a fine night for a murder or robbery. Farina is frightened, but his mother still has to do laundry, so he is left in a ramshackle house with windows so weak that the wind blows through. A few doors down, Jackie is spanked by his father for refusing to do his homework; his little brother Wheezer is laughing at him. After being spanked, Jackie throws his school book out the window.

Later, after he goes to bed, he overhears his parents saying what a great kid he is and how they want him to grow up and be successful. Jackie, touched by this sentiment, climbs out the window to retrieve his book. He tries to get back in but cannot open the window. As he is trying to get back in, he makes all sorts of noises, causing more commotion in the neighborhood. Jackie tries to break a window by throwing something, but the wind blows the object over to a nearby house and breaks a window there, waking up Chubby and his parents. When Jackie manages to get into Wheezer's room through another window, Wheezer's dog, Pete, pushes Jackie back out again. Mary Ann next door also wakes up. Jackie manages to get into Mary Ann's room, but she throws him out as well. As he falls out of Mary Ann's window, he lands on a real burglar, knocking him out. Jackie is then considered a hero.

Cast

The Gang
 Norman Chaney as Chubby
 Jackie Cooper as Jackie
 Allen Hoskins as Farina
 Bobby Hutchins as Wheezer
 Mary Ann Jackson as Mary Ann
 Pete the Pup as Himself

Additional cast
 Betty Jane Beard - Hector
 Chet Brandenburg - Flustered man
 Mary Gordon - Chubby's mother
 Edgar Kennedy - Kennedy the Cop
 Charles McAvoy - Henry, Jackie's dad
 Emma Reed - Farina's mother
 Julian Rivero - Henry, Jackie's dad (Spanish language version)

Notes
When the Wind Blows is the first Our Gang film to feature a music score. The music is an orchestral scoring of songs popular at the time (including "My Man"), not the jazz-based scorings typical of Our Gang films. It also marked Edgar Kennedy's last Our Gang appearance.
All scenes with Farina were deleted in 1970 from the Little Rascals television print due to perceived racism but were reinstated on AMC's airings in 2001 to 2003.

See also
 Our Gang filmography

References

External links

1930 films
American black-and-white films
1930 comedy films
Films directed by James W. Horne
Hal Roach Studios short films
Our Gang films
1930s American films